Buchimgae, or Korean pancake, refers broadly to any type of pan-fried ingredients soaked in egg or a batter mixed with other ingredients. More specifically, it is a dish made by pan-frying a thick batter mixed with egg and other ingredients until a thin flat pancake-shaped fritter is formed.

Types

Buchimgae
 hobak-buchimgae – Korean zucchini pancake
 kimchi-buchimgae – kimchi pancake
 memil-buchimgae – buckwheat pancake
 some varieties of pajeon – scallion pancake
 some varieties of buchu-jeon – garlic chive pancake

Jeon

Jeon is a dish made by frying a mixture of seasoned sliced or minced fish, meat, and vegetables in oil. Ingredients are coated with wheat flour prior to pan-frying the mixture in oil.

Bindae-tteok

Bindae-tteok is a dish made by grinding soaked mung beans, adding vegetables and meat, and pan-frying until the mixture has attained a round and flat shape. No flour or egg is added in bindae-tteok.

Jangtteok
Jangtteok is a dish made by adding wheat flour to gochujang or doenjang (soybean paste). Vegetables, such as Java waterdropworts or scallions, are added and the mixture pan-fried in oil into a thin flat pancake.

Gallery

See also 
 Bánh xèo
 Okonomiyaki

References 

 
Korean cuisine
Fritters